The Rodrigues warbler (Acrocephalus rodericanus) is a species of Old World warbler in the family Acrocephalidae.

It is found only on the island of Rodrigues (which belongs to Mauritius) and used to be plentiful there. Their population soon got smaller. Cyclone Monique in 1968 almost wiped out the entire species. Then a cyclone in 1979 reduced the population even more. The main threats to these birds is the destruction of vegetation for fuel or grazing, rats, and cyclones (natural disasters).

Its natural habitats are subtropical or tropical dry shrubland, subtropical or tropical moist shrubland, and plantations.

It is threatened by habitat loss.

References

Birds described in 1865
Fauna of Rodrigues
Birds of Mauritius
Taxonomy articles created by Polbot